William J. Rewak, S.J. was appointed Santa Clara University's 26th president after the presidency of Thomas D. Terry

References

 Gerald McKevitt, S.J. The University of Santa Clara: A History, 1851-1977 (Page 385)
 Yearbook of higher education: a directory of colleges and universities(Page 76)
 J. Patrick Murphy, Visions and values in Catholic higher education
 http://www.scu.edu/president/history/past.cfm

1816 births
1897 deaths
19th-century Italian Jesuits
Presidents of Santa Clara University
19th-century American clergy